Tashla (Taşlı) is a rural locality (a village) in Tashlinsky Selsoviet, Gafuriysky District, Bashkortostan, Russia. The population was 507 as of 2010. There are 8 streets.

Geography 
Tashla is located 12 km east of Krasnousolsky (the district's administrative centre) by road. Pchelosovkhoz is the nearest rural locality.

References 

Rural localities in Gafuriysky District